Castello Caldoresco (Italian for Caldora Castle)  is a  Renaissance castle in Vasto, Province of Chieti, Abruzzo, south-eastern Italy. It is a private property and therefore is not open to the public.
 
It was built in the early 15th century by the then-lord of the city, Jacopo Caldora, starting from a pre-existing large tower (which in turn dated to the 14th-15th centuries). Later it was modified and restored by Innico d'Avalos d'Aragona.

The castle is located on a promontory overlooking the Adriatic Sea coast. It includes four buildings connected, within a square courtyard inside. Three of the four corners features a cylindrical tower, while the bastions visible in some parts are among the oldest features.

References

External links

Caldoresco (Vasto)
Vasto